Lehideux is a French surname that may refer to
Bernard Lehideux (born 1944), French politician, nephew of François
François Lehideux (1904–1998), French industrialist and politician
Lehideux and Isorni v France, a 1998 case heard by the European Court of Human Rights
Martine Lehideux (born 1933), French politician, niece of François, sister of Bernard

French-language surnames